Duane D. Thiessen (born March 11, 1951, in Goessel, Kansas) is a retired lieutenant general in the United States Marine Corps, and is the past commander of the United States Marine Corps Forces Pacific, serving from September 2, 2010, until his retirement on August 7, 2012. Lt. General Thiessen is currently serving as president and CEO of the National Naval Aviation Museum Foundation located on Naval Air Station Pensacola.

Biography
Thiessen was commissioned a second lieutenant in May 1974, after graduating from Pittsburg State University. Following completion of flight training, he reported to Marine Corps Air Station Cherry Point, North Carolina, for transition training to the AV-8B Harrier II. In July 1982, Captain Thiessen reported to Marine Aviation Weapons and Tactics Squadron 1 in Yuma, Arizona, where he served as an AV-8 tactics instructor.

In December 1985, Major Thiessen returned to Cherry Point and was assigned to VMA-231 as the Operations Officer, where he led a detachment of six AV-8Bs that deployed to the Mediterranean Sea as part of the 22nd Marine Expeditionary Unit. Upon returning to the United States in 1988, Major Thiessen attended the Naval Command and Staff College in Newport, Rhode Island. Following graduation he reported to Naval Air Systems Command, Washington, D.C., and served as an assistant to the AV-8B program manager.

In June 1991, Lieutenant Colonel Thiessen assumed command of VMAT-203 at Cherry Point. After relinquishing command, he returned to Washington, DC, to attend the National War College. He was subsequently assigned as the Marine Requirements Officer in the Joint Strike Fighter Program office. Colonel Thiessen then served until June 1999 as the Commanding Officer of Marine Aircraft Group 13 in Yuma.

Following command of MAG-13, Colonel Thiessen served in the Aviation Plans and Policy Branch of Headquarters Marine Corps until July 2000, when he was appointed to the position of Deputy Assistant Secretary of the Navy for Expeditionary Force Programs. Colonel Thiessen was promoted to brigadier general and assumed the duties as the deputy director of operations, National Military Command Center in October 2001. He then served until May 2004 as the Deputy Naval Inspector General for Marine Corps Matters/Inspector General of the Marine Corps. Thiessen was then assigned as the Commanding General of 1st Marine Aircraft Wing in Okinawa, Japan, from 3 June 2004 to 10 June 2005, followed by a two-year tour as Commander, Marine Forces Korea and assistant Chief of Staff, U/C/J-5, United Nations Command, Combined Forces Command, and the United States Forces Korea.

In June 2007, Major General Thiessen returned to the United States and assumed the duties of Assistant Deputy Commandant for Programs and Resources (Programs) at Headquarters United States Marine Corps. Thiessen was nominated for promotion to the rank of Lieutenant General on March 13, 2008, to become the Deputy Commandant for Programs and Resources.

Secretary of Defense Robert M. Gates announced March 15, 2010 that LtGen Duane D. Thiessen has been nominated for reappointment to the rank of lieutenant general with assignment as commander, U.S. Marine Corps Forces Pacific; commanding general, Fleet Marine Force Pacific; and commander, Marine Corps Bases Pacific.

Lieutenant General Thiessen is married to Lynn Rodd and they have two children.

Awards

See also

References

 Official Marine Corps biography

1951 births
Living people
People from Marion County, Kansas
Military personnel from Kansas
United States Naval Aviators
College of Naval Command and Staff alumni
Pittsburg State University alumni
Recipients of the Legion of Merit
United States Marine Corps generals
Recipients of the Defense Superior Service Medal